Bette is a self-titled studio album by American singer Bette Midler. It was released by Warner Bros. Records on October 10, 2000 in the United States to coincide with the premiere of her her self-titled CBS sitcom.
Midler covered songs on this album written by artists like Elvis Costello and Kirsty MacColl, mixed with cover versions of classic soul and R&B songs from the 1970s, including "Shining Star", "Love T.K.O." and "Just My Imagination (Running Away with Me)".

Upon release, the album only reached number 69 on US Billboard 200, and Warner Bros. subsequently dropped Midler from its roster in 2001 because of declining record sales. A maxi-single with several remixes of "In These Shoes" was released to promote the album. It reached number eight on the US Billboard Dance Music/Club Play Singles and number 14 on the Hot Dance Music/Maxi-Singles Sales charts.

Critical reception

AllMusic editor William Ruhlmann rated the album four out of five stars and called Bette "an excellent album to tie in with the premiere of her network television show. Was seems to conceive of Midler as a kind of pre-rock, neo-Brill Building performer, frequently putting her into mid-tempo pop arrangements of old R&B ballads [...] Fans of the bawdy Bette and the bathetic Bette may be disappointed, but the rest of her followers will enjoy the balance and consistency of this collection." Richard Abowitz, writing for Rolling Stone, noted that Bette "finds Midler backed by her touring band, working ballads and vamps with a distinctive style perfected over decades of performing. Midler's secret weapon has always been her ability to pick material, and Bette is no exception."

Chart performance
Bette debuted and peaked at number 69 on the US Billboard 200. This marked Midler's lowest-charting album by then, resulting into Warner Bros. subsequently dropping her from its roster in 2001 because of declining record sales. By October 2003, the album had sold 226,000 copies in the United States, according to Nielsen SoundScan.

Track listing

Personnel

 Produced by Don Was
 Recorded and mixed by Ed Cherney
 "Bless You Child" produced by Don Was and Rick Nowels
 "Nobody Else but You" (from the Columbia TriStar Television series Bette) produced by Marc Shaiman and Don Was Band
 Drums – Sonny Emory
 Bass – Reggie Hamilton
 Piano, Fender Rhodes, B3 – Bobby Lyle
 Keyboards, piano – Larry Cohn
 Guitar – Mike Miller
 Guitar – Dwight Sills
 Percussion – Lenny Castro

Additional musicians:
 Drums – James Gadson
 Bass – Abraham Laboriel
 Guitar – Mark Goldenberg, Paul Jackson Jr., Prince Eyango, Tim Pierce, Dean Parks
 Keyboards – Jamie Muhoberac, Rick Nowels, Greg Kurstin, Marc Shaiman
 Trumpet – Mark Isham, Darrell Leonard, Jerry Hey, Gary Grant
 Tenor saxophone – Plas Johnson, Joe Sublett, Dan Higgins, Jerry Vivino
 Baritone saxophone – Gary Herbig
 Trombone – Eric M. Jorgensen
 "Bless You Child" programming – Charles Judge, Wayne Rodrigues
 Background singers – Hilard "Sweet Pea" Atkinson, Cynthia Bass, Harry Bowens, Carlos Cuevas, Donna De Lory, Cleto Escobedo II, David Lasley, Mirley Espinoza, Nikki Harris, Don McCrary, Howard McCrary, Leon McCrary, Arnold McCuller, Esther Nicholson, Martin Padilla, Melanie Taylor, Maria Vidal
 "Nobody Else but You" arranged by Marc Shaiman and Jimmy Vivino
 Project coordinator and contractor – Shari Sutcliffe
 Assistant to Don Was: Jane Oppenhemier
 Recorded at Cello Studios in Hollywood, CA; Chung King in New York, NY; Record Plant in Hollywood, CA and Sony Music Studios in New York, NY
 Mixed at Record Plant in Hollywood, CA
 "Nobody Else but You" mixed at Sony Music Studios in New York, NY
 Assistant engineers – Alan Sanderson, Elliott Blakey, Dave Ashton, Alex Olsson, Katie Teasdale, Tulio Torrinello Jr. and Andy Manganello
 Mastered by Doug Sax at The Mastering Lab in Hollywood, CA
 Mark Isham appears countesy of Columbia Records
 Art direction and design – Linda Cobb
 Photography – Greg Gorman (cover) and Norman Jean Roy
 Hair – Robert Ramos
 Make-up – Eugenia Weston
 Stylists – Michael Eisenhower, Bob Sparkman

Charts

References

2000 albums
Albums produced by Don Was
Albums produced by Rick Nowels
Bette Midler albums
Warner Records albums